Wentworth is a small village near Ely in Cambridgeshire, England. The village is centred on St Peter’s Church and a number of listed buildings at the junction of Main Street and Church Road. Residents travel to nearby settlements, including Ely for many goods and services. In 2015, there was  no public transport serving the village. However, as of 2017, there is  a limited bus service and the nearest railway station serving the village is Ely. In the 1870s, Wentworth, Cambridgeshire was described as: " a parish in Ely district, Cambridge; 4½ miles W by S of Ely r. station. Post town, Ely. Acres, 1,437. Real property, £2,653. Pop., 180. Houses, 40. The living is a rectory in the diocese of Ely. Value, £450.* Patrons, the Dean and Chapter of Ely. The church is partly Norman, chiefly early English, and all good."It is thought the name 'Wentworth' is:"English: habitational name from places in Cambridgeshire and South Yorkshire called 'Wentworth', probably from the Old English byname Wintra meaning 'winter' + Old English worð 'enclosure'. It is, however, also possible that the name referred to a settlement inhabited only in winter."The Domesday entry for Wentworth suggests that the village was then a fairly large one. Later, however, it declined in size.

Demographics 
The population of the civil parish at the 2011 Census was 200. According to the 2011 Census there were 78 Males and 122 Females living in the Parish. "In the first national Census of 1881, the total population was recorded as 115. The population has remained very small since that time. It had dropped to 81 by the 1931 Census and now stands at 200." The time series graph below shows the change in population, 1801-2011. There was  no Census conducted in 1941:
The population breakdown by age as at 2011 is shown in the table below:

These statistics have been compiled by Cambridgeshire County Council using data published by the Office for National Statistics to develop an excel data base for ease of access.

Industry 
The tables below show:

The population breakdown by occupation in Wentworth by gender, 1881 (left). Total population at the time was 143. However, this data only refers to 49% of the total population. The breakdown of economic activity in 2011 (right). This information has also been collated by Cambridgeshire County Council .

The Church of St Peter 
The Grade II* listed parish church is dedicated to St Peter. "There has been a church on the site since the 12th century. This was extended in the 13th and 14th centuries and extensively restored and partially rebuilt in 1868. The church site now also serves as a venue for the Village Hall and is located in the centre of the village."

School 
Wentworth had a small dame school in 1789. In 1846-7 it was reported that a Sunday-school, attended by 8 boys and 15 girls, was held in the chancel of the church. The parish clerk taught the pupils, and also held classes on weekday evenings in summer. In 1899, the average attendance was only 38 and in 1922 only 16. In the latter year, the county council, in the face of much local protest, closed the school. Children now attend school at Witchford.

Present day 
In 2011, the household summary statistics were as follows: 
 Resident population - 200 
 Number of households - 72 
 Number of dwellings (approx) - 74 
 Average household size (people) - 2.78 
In 2010, the village was fortunate to receive funding for a new playpark from both the East Cambs. District Council Pathfinder Scheme, and the National Lottery.

Local plan 
The current local plan for East Cambridgeshire District Council (dated 2015) sets out a general blueprint for future growth (including Wentworth) up to 2031. It says that growth during this period will continue with an estimated 11 new dwellings, which will increase the total number of dwellings to 119. The Plan aims  to prevent sprawl into the open countryside unless there are exceptional circumstances, such as essential dwellings for rural workers, or affordable housing. It also says that new employment proposals will be supported in principle, noting that there are no business premises in the village, though a handful of businesses are run from residential properties. It also aims to resist the loss of any community facilities and secure funding for improvements where possible.

References

External links

St Peter's Church on the Corpus of Romanesque Sculpture in Britain & Ireland (CRSBI)

Villages in Cambridgeshire
Civil parishes in Cambridgeshire
East Cambridgeshire District